Salli Setta (born March 3, 1965) is an American restaurateur and businesswoman. She is the former President of Red Lobster, an American casual seafood restaurant chain owned by parent company, Golden Gate Capital.  Setta was named president in 2013, while Red Lobster was operated by Darden Restaurants, Inc. She served as the Executive Vice President of Marketing for Red Lobster from 2005 until July 2013, when she was named president.

Setta joined Darden Restaurants in 1990 as a sales assistant at Olive Garden. She held numerous positions during her 15-year tenure with the brand, including Vice President of Brand Marketing and Senior Vice President of Culinary and Beverage. Setta graduated from the University of Central Florida with a degree in communications in 1987, and earned an MBA from the Florida Institute of Technology in 1992.

In January 2016, Setta was named a board member of the Women's Foodservice Forum (WFF), the food industry's premier leadership development organization. Setta, a 25-year veteran of the restaurant industry, was selected for, "her experience leading a globally recognized brand that is committed to supporting the advancement of women and will serve two three-year terms on WFF's board."
She has a daughter named Juliana Setta.

References

External links
 Red Lobster – Management

American women chief executives
University of Central Florida alumni
Florida Institute of Technology alumni
Living people
American chief executives of food industry companies
1965 births
21st-century American women